Zerner is a surname. Notable people with the surname include:

Larry Zerner (born 1963), American lawyer and actor
Michael Zerner (1940–2000), American theoretical chemist and professor
William Zerner (1882–1963), Australian school principal and schoolteacher

See also
Zürner